Georgesville is an unincorporated community in western Pleasant Township, Franklin County, Ohio, United States. It is located southwest of Columbus, the county seat of Franklin County and the capital and largest city of Ohio.

History
Situated across the Big Darby from Georgesville, on the eastern bank below the confluence, the O.C. Voss site includes a Fort Ancient village and ceremonial mound. The reconstructed mound is located along the Ancient Trail in Battelle Darby Creek Park.

In 1797, Georgesville was founded as Central Ohio's first permanent white settlement (the same year as Franklinton). The town was originally situated on the eastern bank of Big Darby, now the site of Oak Grove Cemetery. A railway station was built on the western bank of Big Darby, and Georgesville occupies this west bank site today, although the railway station is long gone.  A minor debate exists as to which white settlement, Georgesville or Franklinton, was first laid down In the region. What is not disputed is that Native Americans such as the Shawnee Tribe were long established in the Scioto River valley and adjoining high bank areas before white settlers moved to the area. 

The rail line is still active with service to the grain silos in the nearby village of Lilly Chapel.  Outside seasonal transport of farm products the line has seen use as storage for surplus rail cars.  The line is known as CAMY on the Ohio Rail Map.  This rail line ends just west of Lilly Chapel although its abandoned right-of-way continues west to London, Ohio.

The current rail line towers over the Darby Creek just south of the Confluence.  The current rail bridge is partially built on the foundations of a former rail bridge with unused foundation pillars remaining.  The current bridge is a steel beam construction. 

Alkire Road, which travels west and east out of the village, originally featured two wooden covered bridges, spanning the Big and Little Darby above their confluence. The covered bridges were replaced by steel truss bridges (a Pratt truss over Little Darby and a Camelback truss over Big Darby), which were in turn replaced by modern reinforced concrete bridges, in a new configuration, in the 1990s. Before the truss bridges were torn down ODOT tests involving maximum load were conducted. At the time these bridge types were still common throughout the Midwest. The testing & destruction of the bridges provided a wealth of information for civil engineers.  Reports indicated that designs were sound but the fixed height of overhead truss members limited vehicle heights.

This area was subject to historic flooding in 1913, throughout Ohio that year. 

Today the Darby Creek waterways is one of many entry points for Battelle Darby Creek Park. The Darby watershed is one of the most biologically diverse aquatic systems in the Midwest due to conservation efforts in the area along the waterway.  State and National designations have been placed upon the creeks in recent years.  The park is part of the Columbus and Franklin County Metro Park System and sister parks exist upstream and downstream forming the western boundary of the metro system. 

Battelle is a research and development organization based in Columbus, Ohio.  They have maintained a long connection with the parks establishment.

The Camp Chase Multi-Use Trail runs alongside the still active rail line running through the village.

The Georgesville Fish Fry was a staple event for many years.  It was held in the village center near the old Fire Station.

Geography
Georgesville lies at the confluence of Little Darby Creek and Big Darby Creek, which are State and National Scenic Rivers and tributaries of the Scioto River. Much of the swamp forest and prairie surrounding Georgesville is part of Battelle Darby Creek Park.

Notable persons
 George L. Converse, U.S. Representative from Ohio (1879–1881)
 John Lewis Dyer, Methodist preacher, born and raised in Georgesville

See also
 Roberts Pass

References

Unincorporated communities in Franklin County, Ohio
Populated places established in 1797
Unincorporated communities in Ohio